Riley Schmidt (born February 11, 1976) is an American actor.

Biography
After college, he moved to Hollywood and landed a small role on Passions. He would later guest star on other shows such as 7th Heaven, ER, Power Rangers Time Force and Cold Case.  In 2011 he was cast as the Rubber Man in American Horror Story. In 2015 and 2016, he played the Red Devil and the Green Meanie on Scream Queens.

Filmography
American Horror Story: Apocalypse (2018) — Rubber Man
Scream Queens (2015) — Red Devil & Green Meanie
American Horror Story (2011) — Rubber Man
Melissa & Joey (2011) — Stan
Days of Our Lives (2011) — Adam
The Game of Their Lives (2005) — Simpkins Ford Soccer Player
ER (2005) — Matt
Drake & Josh (2004) — GuyCold Case (2004) — Adam Clarke 1969Minority Report (2002) — Pre-Crime EmployeePower Rangers Time Force (2001) — DashSabrina, the Teenage Witch (2000) — Dream GuyCity Guys (2000) — JordanS Club 7: Artistic Differences (2000) — ZachProvidence (2000) — Harry7th Heaven (2000) — BobbyPassions'' (1999) — Pete

Gallery

References

External links

1976 births
Living people
American stunt performers
American male television actors
Male actors from St. Louis
University of Missouri alumni